Venantino Venantini (17 April 1930 – 9 October 2018) was an Italian film actor.

Among the almost 150 films he performed in, some became cult favorites such as Les Tontons flingueurs, Amore libero - Free Love, Black Emanuelle and City of the Living Dead. 

He acted with actors such as Lino Ventura, Yves Montand, Alain Delon and Gérard Depardieu and for directors such as Ettore Scola, Luciano Salce and Dino Risi and for French film directors such as Georges Lautner, Gérard Oury and Claude Lelouch.

Selected filmography

 A Day in Court (1954) - Ufficiale al varietà (uncredited)
 No Sun in Venice (1957)
 Ben Hur (1959) - Palefrenier de la course de chars (uncredited)
 Odissea nuda (1961) - Film Maker
 Pastasciutta nel deserto (1961) - Malapaga
 La guerra continua (1962) - Alberto
 The Captive City (1962) - Gen. Ferolou
 Les Tontons flingueurs (1963) - Pascal
 Il vuoto (1964) - Andrea Masi
 Salad by the Roots (1964) - Pierre Michon
 Le conseguenze (1964) - Valerio
 La Celestina P... R... (1965) - Carlo
 Le Corniaud (1965) - Mickey dit le bègue ou la souris
 The Agony and the Ecstasy (1965) - Paris De Grassis
 Galia (1966) - Greg
 Balearic Caper (1966) - Giuliano
 Le Grand Restaurant (1966) - Henrique
 La grande sauterelle (1967) - Vladimir
 Round Trip (1967) - Marc Daumel
 Bandidos (1967) - Billy Kane
 The Killer Likes Candy (1968) - Costa
 Love in the Night (1968) - Bollert
 Anzio (1968) - Capt. Burns
 Emma Hamilton (1968) - Le prince Carraciola
 The Libertine (1968) - Aurelio
 Hate Is My God (1969) - Sweetley
 Erotissimo (1969) - Sylvio
 Playgirl 70 (1969)
 The War Devils (1969) - Heinrich Meinike
 Are You Engaged to a Greek Sailor or an Airline Pilot? (1970) - Ministre
 The Priest's Wife (1970) - Maurizio
 Quella chiara notte d'ottobre (1970)
 Macédoine (1971) - Brian Goffy
 Laisse aller... c'est une valse (1971) - Tosca
 La araucana (1971) - Pedro de Valdivia
 Per amore o per forza (1971) - Padre di Jane
 Delusions of Grandeur (1971) - Del Basto
 Il était une fois un flic... (1972) - Felice - le tueur
 La rossa dalla pelle che scotta (1972)
 Le Rempart des béguines (1972) - Max
 Racconti proibiti... di niente vestiti (1972) - Soldier from Sicily
 Seven Deaths in the Cat's Eye (1973) - Father Robertson
 Profession: Aventuriers (1973) - Pablo
 Number One (1973) - Rudy
 The Police Serve the Citizens? (1973) - Mancinelli
 Un modo di essere donna (1973) - Simone
 Troppo rischio per un uomo solo (1973) - Piero Albertini
 Le führer en folie (1974) - Italian waiter / valet
 And Now My Love (1974) - Very Italian Italian Man
 Amore libero - Free Love (1974) - Chavad
 Black Emanuelle (1975) - William Meredith
 Emmanuelle 2 (1975) - The Polo Player
 Calore in provincia (1975) - Santuzzo
 Il letto in piazza (1976) - 'Bogart'
 Emanuelle in Bangkok (1976) - David
 A.A.A. cercasi spia... disposta spiare per conto spie (1976) - Roger, Capo della CIA
 Young, Violent, Dangerous (1976) - Sign. Morandi
 Il pomicione (1976) - Renato
 Nine Guests for a Crime (1977) - Walter
 Rene the Cane (1977) - Carlo
 L'altra metà del cielo (1977) - Mister Rickie
 La Bidonata (1977) - The Frenchman
 La bravata (1977) - Walter
 The Greatest Battle (1978) - Michael
 Emanuelle and the White Slave Trade (1978) - Giorgio Rivetti
 War of the Robots (1978) - Paul
 First Love (1978) - Emilio, TV channel owner
 La Cage aux Folles (1978) - Le chauffeur de Charrier
 The Concorde Affair (1979) - Forsythe
 Cop or Hood (1979) - Mario
 The Humanoid (1979)
 From Corleone to Brooklyn (1979) - Lt. Danova
 Gardenia (1979) - Nocita
 On est venu là pour s'éclater (1979) - Norbert
 Tre sotto il lenzuolo (1979)
 Riavanti... Marsch! (1979) - Sergeant Sconocchia
 Terror Express (1980) - Mike
 Sesso profondo (1980) - Mr. Murphy
 La terrazza (1980) - Un ospite
 Flatfoot in Egypt (1980) - Ruotolo
 Beast in Space (1980) - Juan Cardoso
 La padrina (1980)
 Cannibal Apocalypse (1980) - Lieutenant Hill (uncredited)
 Contraband (1980) - Captain Tarantino
 City of the Living Dead (1980) - Mr. Ross
 Cannibal Ferox (1981) - Sgt. Ross
 Longshot (1981) - Henri Bresson
 Giggi il bullo (1982) - Don Salvatore
 Sesso e volentieri (1982) - Man in the cinema
 Dio li fa poi li accoppia (1982) - Occhipinti
 The New Barbarians (1982) - Father Moses
 Exterminators of the Year 3000 (1983) - John
 Attention une femme peut en cacher une autre! (1983) - Nino
 Le bon roi Dagobert (1984) - Demetrius, marchand
 Windsurf - Il vento nelle mani (1984) - Walter
 Ladyhawke (1985) - Bishop's Secretary
 Liberté, égalité, choucroute (1985) - Un sans culotte
 The Adventures of Hercules (1985) - High Priest
 The Assisi Underground (1985) - Pietro
 Final Justice (1985) - Joseph Palermo
 Sogni erotici di Cleopatra (1985) - Dolabella (uncredited)
 De flyvende djævle (1985) - Luigi
 The Lion's Share (1985) - Enzo Gatti
 Il pentito (1985)
 Superfantagenio (1986) - Puncher
 Capriccio (1987) - Alfredo
 Madame, nuda è arrivata la straniera (1989) - Fisher (uncredited)
 Vanille fraise (1989) - Anselmo
 The King's Whore (1990) - Luis de Arragon / Louis d'Aragon
 Mutande pazze (1992) - Alessia's Father
 Madrugada de sangue (1992)
 Il respiro della valle (1992)
 Blu notte (1992) - Father
 Giovani e belli (1996) - Buby
 L'amico di Wang (1997) - Ezio
 The Eighteenth Angel (1997) - Clockmaker
 We'll Really Hurt You (1998) - Pietro
 The Dinner (1998)
 Toni (1999) - Minelli
 Livraison à domicile (2003) - Giuseppe, le père de Thomas
 Ho visto le stelle (2003) - Duilio Masera
 Atomik Circus - Le retour de James Bataille (2004) - Matt Kelso
 Could This Be Love? (2007) - Della Ponte
 I Always Wanted to Be a Gangster (2007) - Joe
 The Hideout (2007) - Telephone Installer
 Nos 18 ans (2008) - Marcello
 The Museum of Wonders (2010) - Master of Ceremonies
 22 Bullets (2010) - Padovano
 Bloody Sin (2011) - Il prelato
 Hyde's Secret Nightmare (2011) - Barman
 Phantasmagoria (2014) - Grandpa (segment "My Gift to You")
 P.O.E. Pieces of Eldritch (P.O.E. 3) (2014)
 Papa lumière (2015) - Le gérant de l'hôtel
 Un plus une (2015) - Henri
 The Very Private Life of Mister Sim (2015) - Monsieur Matteotti père
 Marseille (2016) - Giovanni
 Vive la crise (2017) - Luigi Pirandello
 Maryline (2017) - Elio, le patron du restaurant

References

External links

1930 births
2018 deaths
Italian male film actors
People from the Province of Ancona
Nastro d'Argento winners
20th-century Italian male actors
21st-century Italian male actors